Wynonna & Naomi is the first extended play by American country duo The Judds. It was released in February 1984 by RCA Records and was produced by Brent Maher. It was the duo's first album release in their career and would be followed later in the year by their first full-length album, Why Not Me. The album was part of a "mini-album" marketing strategy designed by RCA to promote up-and-coming acts on their roster.

Wynonna & Naomi was named for the members of the duo, Naomi Judd and Wynonna Judd, who had just recently signed with RCA Records after several years attempting to gain a recording contract. The original version included six tracks, including one song composed by Naomi Judd. The album included the duo's first two hits: "Had a Dream (For the Heart)" and "Mama He's Crazy." The EP itself would also reach positions on the Billboard charts in 1984.

Background
In 1983, The Judds signed their first recording contract with RCA Nashville. Consisting of mother, Naomi Judd, and daughter, Wynonna Judd, the duo auditioned on spot at the label's headquarters in Nashville, Tennessee. The pair would remain at RCA through the 1980s and have a series of major hits. Following their signing, the duo  began making decisions on putting together their first album. RCA decided on first recording an extended play (mini-album of six songs), a marketing strategy that been successful for several other label performers. If successful, the intent was for the duo to release a full-length album at a later date.

Content and recording
A total of six songs were chosen for the mini-album. In 1983, The Judds signed with Broadcast Music, Inc. so that Naomi could gain publishing royalties from songs she composed. Following this decision, Naomi's composition, "Change of Heart," was chosen for the record. In addition, "John Deere Tractor" was also chosen. According to Naomi Judd, the song's original composer could not be originally determined. Instead, a bank account was opened for his royalties from the track. The duo's producer, Brent Maher, played them "Had a Dream (For the Heart)," which was originally recorded by Elvis Presley. Despite original hesitations about recording an Elvis track, the duo eventually agreed cut it with a new arrangement.

Maher arranged for songwriters to meet The Judds in person to play songs they could possibly record. Nashville songwriter, Harlan Howard, was invited to dinner at The Judds' house where he played them his composition, "The Blue Nun Cafe." The duo agreed to recording it for the project. In addition, mother Naomi Judd went to several publishing companies to hear songs the duo could possibly record. At one of these companies, she met songwriter Kenny O'Dell, who played her his song "Mama He's Crazy." Naomi connected with its lyrics and decided to choose the song for the upcoming album.

Wynonna & Naomi was recorded in March 1983 at the Creative Workshop, also located in Nashville. Naomi wanted her and her daughter to stay focused on the recording process. To stay on task, the duo agreed on a dress codes and made a sign outside the studio door, according to her autobiography, Love Can Build a Bridge. The songs were cut in a total of three days. According to Naomi, the duo decided to lay down the vocals with only producer Brent Maher and musician, Don Potter present. "Our singing came from instinct, deep and spontaneous," she recalled in her 1993 book. The album was completed at a budget of $36,000.

Release and reception

Before the album's release, "Had a Dream (For the Heart)" was issued as the lead single. It was first released in December 1983 on RCA Records. The song spent a total of 18 weeks on the Billboard Hot Country Songs chart. In March 1984, the single reached number 17 on the chart, becoming the duo's first major hit and top 20 single. On the Canadian RPM Country Singles chart, it reached a similar top 20 position. In February 1984, Wynonna & Naomi was officially released on RCA. The record was originally offered in 12 inch vinyl and as an audio cassette.

Wynonna & Naomi became the duo's first charting album released on the Billboard Top Country Albums survey, where it peaked at number eight. It also reached number 153 on the Billboard 200. In April 1984, "Mama He's Crazy" was spawned as the second single from the extended play. It became The Judds' first of several number one hits during the 1980s. In total, "Mama He's Crazy" spent 23 weeks on the Billboard country songs chart before topping the list in August 1984. It was also their first number one Canadian country single.

Following its release, Wynonna & Naomi received positive reviews from writers and critics. Music journalist Robert Christgau gave the album an "A−" rating in his review: "They've got a gimmick--not only are they a mother-and-daughter act, you can't tell who's who. But the music's simply solid--three fine ones plus three pretty good ones equals the most actively pleasurable Nashville of the year." Thom Owens of Allmusic rated the album 4.5 out of 5 possible stars in his review. Owens praised the mother-daughter harmonies the quality of material found on the album. He concluded by comparing the album to future releases: "The best moments on The Judds have been compiled on their numerous hit compilation, yet it remains a pleasant listen for most dedicated fans."

Track listing

Vinyl version

Cassette version

Compact disc version

Personnel
All credits are adapted from the liner notes of Wynonna & Naomi.

The Judds
 Naomi Judd – harmony vocals
 Wynonna Judd – lead vocals

Musical personnel
 Eddie Bayers – drums
 Mark Casstevens – harmonica, rhythm guitar
 Sonny Garrish – Dobro, steel guitar
 Bobby Ogdin – piano
 Don Potter – acoustic guitar, bandleader
 Jack Williams – bass guitar

Technical personnel
 Brent Maher – producer

Chart performance

Certifications

Release history

References

Books

External links
 The Judds: Wynonna & Naomi at Wynonna Judd's official website

1984 debut EPs
Albums produced by Brent Maher
Curb Records EPs
The Judds albums
RCA Records EPs